Urmian Christian Neo-Aramaic is the dialect of Northeastern Neo-Aramaic spoken by Assyrian Christians in Urmia, northwestern Iran. It is a prestige dialect.

Overview 
Aramaic-speaking Assyrian Christians in Urmia and its surrounding areas can be dated via textual references to at least to the 12th century, but it is unclear how long these speakers had been in Urmia prior to those dates. Linguistic evidence indicates that it is likely that the ancestor of modern Christian Urmian migrated to its current location from the mountains of eastern Turkey, and loans also indicate that at some point in its history, Christian Urmian was in contact with Arabic in northern Mesopotamia.

The demographic details of Urmian speakers has changed in the recent history of the language thanks to a variety of historical factors. Prior to the twentieth century, the vast majority of speakers resided not within the town of Urmia, but rather overwhelmingly inhabited rural areas around the town and lived agricultural lifestyles. The political upheavals and ethnic conflict that occurred during the First World War caused widespread movement; on the one hand, numerous Assyrians followed the retreating Russian army and settled in the Caucasus regions, where some Urmian-speaking communities had already been established following the Treaty of Turkmenchay. On the other hand, Assyrians who did not leave the region altogether ended up re-settling not in their former rural homes but rather within Urmia itself, and also established communities in other Iranian cities such as Tabriz, Hamadan and Tehran. The movement into Urmia increased in following decades as Assyrians moved to the town for economic and other reasons. By 2010, the number of Assyrians in the area, almost entirely within Urmia itself, had been reduced to only about 5,000, compared to an estimate of 78,000 in 1914.

The post-Great War immigration of Urmian-speakers to the Soviet Union resulted in several established communities, one of the largest of which is found near Armavir in a town dubbed Urmiya. The retention rate of Urmian among these Assyrians was around 67 percent at least until 1970. In addition to these communities in the North Caucasus, the existence of Urmian-speaking Assyrians in Georgia can be dated even earlier to the 18th century. In addition to communities in Tbilisi and several other towns, the largest and oldest of these communities is in the town of Dzveli Canda in Mtskheta District, and the current overall population of Assyrians in Georgia is roughly 6,000. Prior to a 1937 repression under Stalin's regime, Urmian activity in Georgia was even more vibrant, seeing the establishment of a Christian Urmian theater group and a literary journal (Cuxva d-Madənxa, "Star of the East") in Tbilisi. Still today, some schools in Canda and Tbilisi teach the literary form of C. Urmian.

Following the Treaty of Turkmenchay, Urmian communities were also established in Yerevan province in Armenia. A 1979 census recorded just over 6,000 Assyrians in Armenia, and some villages apparently retained knowledge of, or at least learned, C. Urmian. Following the 1991 independence of Armenia, there has been a major exodus of Assyrians from the country.

The aforementioned upheavals of the 20th century also saw immigration of C. Urmian speakers to North America, Europe, and Australia. Two especially large communities have been established in Chicago and Turlock, in the San Joaquin Valley of California, which today hosts a population of around 15,000 Assyrians primarily of Urmian extraction. These communities still retain knowledge of C. Urmian to varying degrees, especially among older speakers.

Phonology

Notes:
The lax stops are aspirated; the tense ones are unaspirated, but pronounced with tense vocal folds and can therefore be described as glottalized. In all Urmian dialects tense /k͈/ is sometimes pronounced as an ejective [], and in varieties spoken in Georgia, other tense consonants are also sometimes pronounced as ejectives.
Lax /t/ is laminal alveolar while tense /t͈/ is apical alveolar.
/d/ is pronounced laminal in plain contexts but apical in emphatic words.
The distinction between tense and lax is neutralized after a fricative. Aspiration is also not always pronounced at the end of words.
North of Urmia, in the Tabriz dialect, and in most parts of the Caucasus, the affricates are realized as palato-alveolar, i.e. [tʃʰ]. South of Urmia the offset is most commonly [s] or [z] if voiced, but in free variation with a palato-alveolar offset.
In many northern dialects, /c/ and /c͈/ are pronounced as palato-alveolar affricates, often merging with /tʃ/ etc., but there is considerable variation.
/h/ is pronounced [] intervocalically.
Not shown above is the phonemic "suprasegmental emphasis," or word-level pharyngealization. This suprasegmental phoneme is primarily characterized by pharyngealization but also involves retracting the tongue from the primary point of articulation in dorsal and coronal consonants, as well as a degree of lip-rounding and retraction of vowels. While emphatic spreading of the emphatic series of consonants in other Semitic languages is frequent, C. Urmian is best analyzed synchronically as having truly word-level emphasis. Following Khan and others, this is transcribed phonemically with a prefixed +, for example in the minimal pair /ʔarja/ [ʔærjæ] "lion" vs. /+ʔarja/ [ʔɑrˤjɑ], "saint's festival."

References

Sources

'The Missionaries' Assistants: The role of the Assyrians in the development of written Urmia Aramaic' in Journal of the Assyrian Academy Society, 10 (2), 1996

Further reading

Urmia
Christian Northeastern Neo-Aramaic dialects